The Canon EOS 750D, known as the Rebel T6i in the Americas or as the Kiss X8i in Japan, is a 24.2 megapixels entry-mid-level digital SLR announced by Canon on February 6, 2015. As a part of the Canon EOS three-digit/Rebel line, it is the successor to the EOS 700D (Rebel T5i) and the predecessor to the EOS 800D (Rebel T7i).

The 750D was announced and released together with the 760D, a very similar model which adopts some of the ergonomic features of the more expensive 70D.

Features

 24.2 effective megapixel APS-C CMOS sensor
 19 AF points, all cross-type at f/5.6. Center point is high precision, double cross-type at f/2.8 or faster
 DIGIC 6 image processor with 14-bit processing
 Hybrid CMOS AF III
 ISO 100 – 12800 (expandable to H: 25600)
 95% viewfinder frame coverage with 0.82× magnification
 1080p Full HD video recording at 24p, 25p (25 Hz), and 30p (29.97 Hz) with drop frame timing
 720p HD video recording at 60p (59.94 Hz) and 50p (50 Hz)
 480p ED video recording at 30p and 25p
 5.0 frames per second continuous shooting
 3.0" (7.7 cm) vari-angle Clear View II LCD touchscreen with 1,040,000 dots resolution.
 3.5 mm microphone jack for external microphones or recorders
 Wi-Fi + NFC connectivity
 "Anti-flicker" (introduced on the EOS 7D Mk II) – the camera can be set to automatically delay the moment of exposure to compensate for flickering electric lighting

760D 

The 760D was announced together with the EOS 750D (known as the Rebel T6s in the Americas and the 8000D in Japan). It is very similar to the 750D, but adds the following features:
 An LCD information display on top of the body, a feature never before available in the EOS xxxD/Rebel digital line. The last previous consumer-level body with an LCD display was the 35mm film-era EOS 3000N/Rebel XS N.
 A quick control dial on the rear of the body, also a first for the xxxD/Rebel digital line.
 Servo AF (autofocus) in live view mode, allowing for continuous autofocus during shooting bursts. (The 750D/T6i only supports Servo AF when using the optical viewfinder.) Both 750D and 760D camera uses advance Hybrid CMOS AF III sensor and a 19-point AF phase module sensor, The Hybrid Sensor AF system gets activated when a user switches to live view shooting or records a video. All of the current Canon EF Lenses are compatible with the Canon latest Hybrid AF sensor and will do AF perfectly without an issue.

The 750D is used in the Orlan-10 drone.

Predecessor comparison
The Canon EOS 750D (Rebel T6i) is the successor to the EOS 700D (Rebel T5i) with the following improvements.
 Higher Image Resolution: The T5i has a resolution of 17.9 megapixels, whereas the T6i provides 24 MP.
 More AF-Points: 19 vs 9 AF-Points.
 Lighter Body: The T6i is slightly lighter (4 percent) than the T5i.
Built-in Wi-Fi: The T5i doesn't have built-in Wi-Fi, whereas the T6i features both Wi-Fi and NFC (Near Field Communication) technology allow the camera to connect to a compatible device to share images or enable remote control of the camera.

Sensor issues 
On May 8, 2015, Canon USA confirmed a sensor issue on some 750D and 760D cameras which resulted in the appearance of dark circular patterns on the captured image under certain shooting conditions. Canon provided instructions on how to identify potentially affected cameras and offered free repair to any affected camera.

The Hybrid CMOS AF III system is also prone to cause 'banding' - seven pairs of horizontal lines across the image which are particularly noticeable when the image is processed aggressively, this is particularly noticeable in astrophotography. Canon stated "Canon is able to reproduce the stripes. The stripes will appear in those areas where the pixels for the AF are located. This is causing a lower density of image pixels in those areas. This is not a lack of quality, since the effect will be seen only if heavy post-processing is applied."

References

External links 

http://www.dpreview.com/products/canon/slrs/canon_eos750d/specifications
https://web.archive.org/web/20150923200031/http://www.cameracomparisonreview.com/2015/02/06/the-eos-rebel-t6s760d-and-rebel-t6i750d-arrived-with-magnificent-specs/

750D
Cameras introduced in 2015